Opheim is a surname. Notable people with the surname include:

Alf Opheim (1920-2006), Norwegian alpine skier
Aliette Opheim (born 1985), Swedish actress
Berit Opheim (born 1967), Norwegian singer
Kåre Opheim (born 1975), Norwegian musician
Torfinn Opheim (born 1961), Norwegian politician